The Chicago Transit Authority (CTA) is the operator of mass transit in Chicago, Illinois, United States, and some of its surrounding suburbs, including the trains of the Chicago "L" and CTA bus service.

The CTA is an Illinois independent governmental agency that started operations on October 1, 1947, upon the purchase and combination of the transportation assets of the Chicago Rapid Transit Company and the Chicago Surface Lines streetcar system. In 1952, CTA purchased the assets of the Chicago Motor Coach Company, which was under the control of Yellow Cab Company founder John D. Hertz, resulting in a fully unified system. Today, the CTA is one of the three service boards financially supported by the Regional Transportation Authority and CTA service connects with the commuter rail Metra, and suburban bus and paratransit service, Pace.

Operations

The Chicago Transit Authority provides service in Chicago and 10 surrounding suburbs. The CTA provided a total of 532 million rides in 2011,  a 3 percent increase over 2010 with ridership rising to levels not seen for 20 years.

The CTA operates 24 hours each day and on an average weekday provides 1.7 million rides on buses and trains. It has approximately 1,800 buses that operate over 140 routes traveling along . Buses provide about one million passenger trips a day and serve more than 12,000 posted bus stops. Its trains provide about 750,000 customer trips each weekday and serve 145 stations in Chicago and seven suburbs.

Currently, the CTA provides regular service within Chicago and the neighboring suburbs of Forest Park, Evanston, Skokie, Oak Park, Summit, Cicero, Berwyn, North Riverside, Rosemont, Evergreen Park, Park Ridge, Harwood Heights, Norridge, Lincolnwood, and Wilmette.

Fare collection

The CTA accepts payment with a Ventra Card which can be purchased with a single-ride, 1 day unlimited ride ($10), 3 day unlimited ride ($20), 7 day unlimited ride ($28), 30 day unlimited ride ($105), a Ventra disposable ticket, contactless credit or debit card, and certain smartphones. Unlimited ride Ventra cards/tickets are only valid for one passenger. CTA buses also accept cash. Up to three children under 7 can ride free with a fare-paying rider.

The CTA has many free and discounted fare options, for elementary, middle, and high school students, college and university students, people with disabilities, senior citizens, and military service members.

Cash
Only buses allow riders to pay directly with cash at a farebox. Exact fare is required, since no change is given. Since January 7, 2018, the bus full fare is $2.50, the senior/disabled fare is $1.25, and the student fare is $.75. No cash transfers are available. Previously, some rail station turnstiles accepted cash, but this feature has been removed in an effort to speed up boarding. Cash at rail stations is only accepted at Ventra Vending Machines to purchase Ventra cards and tickets.

Transit Cards
The CTA no longer sells Transit Cards. All remaining Transit Cards must have been used by July 1, 2014. In its place CTA has adopted the Ventra Card system. The Ventra Card can be purchased online, Ventra Vending Machines at CTA rail stations, and at authorized retailers like Walgreens, CVS Pharmacies and check cashing locations.

Ventra

Ventra is an electronic fare payment system for the Chicago Transit Authority and Pace that replaced the Chicago Card and the Transit Card automated fare collection system.  Ventra (purportedly Latin for "windy," though the actual Latin word is ventosa) launched in August 2013, with a full system transition slated for July 1, 2014. The Ventra payment system includes several options of payment, including a contactless smart card powered by RFID, a single day or use ticket powered by RFID, any personal bank-issued credit card or debit card that has an RFID chip, and a compatible mobile phone. This includes Google Pay, Apple Pay, and Samsung Pay. Ventra is operated by Cubic Transportation Systems.

Riders using Ventra pay $2.25 for bus, $2.50 for rail (except Blue Line O'Hare station, $5). Disabled & seniors who are 65 or older pay $1.10 for bus, $1.25 for rail. Elementary and high school students  7–20 years old: Valid 5:30 a.m. to 8:30 p.m. on school days pay $.75 during school hours and pay $1.10 during weekends and holidays. The two transfers, within two hours, from the start of a trip is free. After that, it is considered a new trip and the user is charged another fare.

Contactless payments
Ventra readers on buses and rail station turnstiles can accept contactless payments directly from mobile devices. Riders can pay a PAYG fare ($2.50) by touching mobile phones with Apple Pay, Google Pay and Samsung Pay—or any contactless bankcard with the contactless wave symbol.

Equipment
As mandated by the Americans with Disabilities Act of 1990 for all transit operators in the U.S., all CTA buses are accessible, with a ramp on every bus available for use upon request by anyone who has trouble with steps, even temporarily.  The majority of train stations CTA operates have elevators or ramps to provide access for customers with disabilities. All trains include accessible rail cars.

The CTA provides the means to view alerts regarding elevator status at the CTA's Elevator Status Alerts page or by calling an Elevator Status Hotline at 1-888-YOUR-CTA. Accessibility alert notifications also appear, by default, in CTA "Train Tracker", a station arrival prediction tool appearing on its website.

History

In 1953, the CTA placed an order for Flxible buses after the latter's absorption of the Fageol Twin Coach Company.

Until 1973, CTA's fleet included a large number of electric trolley buses – or "trolley coaches", as they were commonly known at the time. In the 1950s, the fleet of around 700 trolley coaches was the largest such fleet in the U.S., and represented about one-quarter of CTA's total number of surface-transit vehicles (motor bus, trolley bus and, until 1958, streetcar). Due to the January 26–27, 1967 Chicago Blizzard, in which CTA trolley buses were unable to maneuver around abandoned automobiles without dewiring, the crucial decision was made to discontinue trolley bus service. Trolley bus service was phased out in the late 1960s and early 1970s, and trolley buses ran for the last time on March 25, 1973.

CTA buses were known as the "green limousine" or the "big green" — buses were one or more shades of green from the CTA's establishment through the end of the 1980s. With the delivery of the TMC RTS buses in 1991, a more patriotic color scheme was adopted, and the green scheme was fully phased out by 1996. A notable color scheme was the "Bicentennial" of about 1974 to 1976.

CTA bought very few buses between the mid-1970s and the end of the 1980s. During this time, purchases were only made in 1979 (20 MAN/AM General SG 220 articulated buses), 1982-83 (200 Flyer D901 buses and 125 additional MAN articulateds), and 1985 (362 MAN Americana standard-length buses). Another aspect of this period was that with the exception of the 1979 and 1983 MAN orders, none of those buses had air-conditioning, a budget saving move by the CTA. The 1972-76 fleet of GM "New Look" buses, 1870 total, which were originally air-conditioned (although there were problems with the air-conditioning systems, resulting in their eventually being disabled and sliding windows installed in the buses), composed the majority of vehicles in service into the early 1990s.

In 1998, the CTA placed an order for 484 new low floor transit buses from Canadian bus-building firm Nova Bus. This executed move billed the CTA as Nova's American launch customer for the latter's signature product, the LFS series. This was also done to meet the "Buy American" requirements for buses in the United States transit bus market, since General Motors ceased bus production and Flxible went out of business.

Today CTA's current fleet of buses is mostly dominated by New Flyer's D40LF, numbered 1000–2029, which replaced buses that were built in 1991 and 1995 (Flxible Buses). In 2014, CTA ordered 400 new buses from Nova. The number increased to 425 after it exercised an option. The buses are numbered 7900–8324. The CTA exercised another option for an additional twenty-five buses, numbered 8325–8349, from Nova. The buses were assigned to the Forest Glen and 103rd St. garages, and began service on its routes February 23, 2019.

The rail orders of the CTA include the last railcar stock built by the Budd Company and rail cars built by Boeing-Vertol and Morrison-Knudsen.

The most recent order was from Bombardier who built the 5000-series from 2009 to 2015. Ten (10) prototypes of the 5000-series were received in 2009, and entered passenger testing in April 2010, with 396 more ordered once the tests were completed. On July 20, 2011, CTA announced the order of 300 more railcars, bringing the total ordered to 706 at a cost of about US$1 billion.

In 2014, the CTA received their first electric buses from New Flyer, making the CTA the first major U.S. transit agency to use the new wave of electric buses as part of a regular service.

Active bus fleet 

Notes:
 Source: Chicago Transit Authority Presentation on Alternative Fuels, April 20th, 2009, p. 4 (accessed 1 July 2009), unless otherwise indicated.
 Some individual numbers may no longer be in service.
 See Chicago Transit and Railfan for historic rosters.

Bus garages

Forest Glen Garage, 5419 W. Armstrong Avenue, (Elston/Bryn Mawr)
North Park Garage, 3112 W. Foster Avenue, (Foster/Albany)
Chicago Garage, 642 N. Pulaski Road, (Chicago/Pulaski)
Kedzie Garage, 358 S. Kedzie Avenue, (Van Buren/Kedzie)
74th Garage, 1815 W. 74th Street, (74th/Wood)
77th Garage, 210 W. 79th Street, (79th/Wentworth)
103rd Garage, 1702 E. 103rd Street, (103rd/Stony Island)

Active "L" rolling stock 
 For a description of the 'L' cars, see Chicago "L" rolling stock.

 See chicago-l.org for car assignment sheets.

Security and safety

After the September 11 attacks, CTA announced its "If you See Something, Say Something" campaign. CTA has also installed a security camera network, and a system to send real time images from cameras in buses directly to emergency responders.

CTA has also been actively prosecuting vandals, announcing on several occasions that felony convictions were obtained against persons who spray painted authority vehicles.

Technology
The CTA installed GPS Bus Tracker systems on all buses starting with the 20 (Madison St) bus in 2006 before expanding it to other routes in 2008. The original claim justifying the addition of this technology was that it would reduce the issue of bunching buses. The system also allows riders to be able to determine the location of buses online.

A report prepared by the CTA claims that there was a decrease in bus bunching from 3.9% to 2.3% from 2007 to 2009, but the report neither demonstrated a direct connection between Bus Tracker and this reduction in bunching, nor did it show whether this was a temporary or permanent phenomenon.

CTA has also made its Bus Tracker and other developer tools available, and is making Bus Tracker arrival data available through text messaging. One of the first applications of the Bus Tracker Developer Tools involved the installation of monitors showing the information in several businesses in Chicago's Wicker Park neighborhood. Using the developer API published by CTA, some augmented CTA bus tracking applications have been developed for mobile phones, and CTA has its own Transit App Center, featuring applications developed by others. CTA also has a train tracker (Beta starting January 2011), and it can also be accessed through a computer, smart phone, or text messaging.

Public art
The CTA is home to a collection of art – including mosaics, sculptures and paintings. More than 50 pieces of art are exhibited at over 40 CTA stations.

According to the CTA's website, the original pieces of artwork contribute to each station's identity and enhance travel for customers. Art promotes a friendly, inviting atmosphere for these stations, which serve as gateways to the communities they serve.

Many of the pieces are a result of the Arts in Transit Program, which is funded by the Federal Transit Administration and coordinated locally through the City of Chicago's Office of Tourism and Culture. A number of other pieces were created through the CTA's Adopt-A-Station program and through partnerships with organizations such as the Chicago Public Art Group.

Arts in Transit
In 2004, the CTA and the City of Chicago Public Art Program installed nine permanent works of art at eight renovated rail stations on what is now known as the Pink Line. The CTA has since created an ongoing program to showcase permanent works of art in conjunction with the City of Chicago Public Art Program. The Arts in Transit Program is funded by the Federal Transit Administration, and created opportunities to develop original artwork for station reconstruction projects along the CTA Red and Brown Lines. Artists were selected for each of the stations included in the Brown Line Capacity Expansion Project and select renovated Red Line stations.

By the completion of the Brown Line Capacity Expansion Project in 2010, original artwork was installed in each of the 18 renovated stations along the CTA's Brown Line. By combining the visibility and accessibility of the city's mass transit system with the creativity of Chicago's art resources, this program resulted in a successful public display of professional works of art designed with input from nearby communities. This program provided high-profile locations for public art and server as a gateway to communities served by the CTA stations. Media under consideration included, but were not limited to, mosaics, art glass, ornamental fencing, mixed-media artwork, and freestanding sculpture and furniture.

The CTA and the City of Chicago Public Art Program, administered by the Office of Tourism and Culture, encouraged and facilitated collaborations between artists, government agencies, the community and other partners. The City of Chicago Public Art Program accepted qualifications from local and national professional artists or artist teams capable of creating permanent public works of art for the CTA Arts in Transit Program for the renovated stations.

CTA promotes its Public Art with a video and online gallery.

TV show
The Chicago Transit Authority produced a monthly television show, Connections, from May 2003 through March 2011. The show, hosted by Braydens Connections, was broadcast on City of Chicago Public-access television cable TV channels 23 & 49, as well as on Comcast's CN100 in the Chicago metropolitan area, including areas of Michigan and Indiana.

Connections featured news and information about the CTA and services it provides. Individual segments from Connections are available on CTA's YouTube channel.

See also

Chicago "L"
List of Chicago Transit Authority bus routes
List of Chicago "L" stations
List of former Chicago "L" stations
Transportation in Chicago
Transit fares
Ventra

References

External links

Chicago Transit Authority - official site

 
Intermodal transportation authorities in Illinois
Rapid transit in Illinois
Bus transportation in Illinois
Regional Transportation Authority (Illinois)
Transportation in Chicago
1947 establishments in Illinois